Civil War Combat is a television series hosted by The History Channel in 1999 to 2003. It described battles of the American Civil War in a graphic, realistic level. Veteran voice actor Tony Jay served as narrator.

The series included battles such as the Battle of Gettysburg, Battle of Cold Harbor, Battle of Shiloh, Battle of Chancellorsville, Battle of Antietam, Battle of Franklin, Battle of the Crater, and Battle of Petersburg.

One of the objectives of the series was to associate people with lesser known regiments and commands. Another one was to provide little known facts of the fields of conflict and to also give an accurate portrayal of the bloodiness of the fighting of the day.

References 

1999 American television series debuts
2003 American television series endings
1990s American documentary television series
2000s American documentary television series
Documentary television series about war
History (American TV channel) original programming
Television series about the American Civil War